This is a list of earthquakes in 1944. Only magnitude 6.0 or greater earthquakes appear on the list. Lower magnitude events are included if they have caused death, injury or damage. Events which occurred in remote areas will be excluded from the list as they wouldn't have generated significant media interest. All dates are listed according to UTC time. Activity was spread across the world during this year. The southwest Pacific Islands saw a good proportion of the earthquakes. Japan had the largest event of the year in December. Argentina and Turkey had the bulk of the deaths. The quake in Argentina in January was the worst in the country's history. New York State had its largest recorded earthquake in September causing some damage.

Overall

By death toll 

 Note: At least 10 casualties

By magnitude 

 Note: At least 7.0 magnitude

Notable events

January

February

March

April

May

June

July

August

September

October

November

December

References

1944
 
1944